Jéssika Alves (born 26 March 1991) is a Brazilian actress who has participated in several telenovelas.

Biography 
Jéssika Alves was born in Curitiba, Paraná state. When she was 15 years old, she moved to Rio de Janeiro to study acting and theater.

Career 
She played Norma Jean, a very popular Malhação character, in the 2009 season of the telenovela, when she was 17 years old. After she left Malhação, Jéssika Alves worked as one of the hosts of TV Globinho. The actress played the prostitute Vânia in the 2011 Rede Globo telenovela Insensato Coração. Jéssika Alves plays Laís in the 2012 telenovela Amor Eterno Amor.

Filmography

Television

Theater

References

External links 

1991 births
Living people
Actresses from Curitiba
21st-century Brazilian actresses
Brazilian telenovela actresses